A Time for Us is the sixth studio album by Donny Osmond, released in 1973. The album reached No. 58 on the Billboard Top LPs chart on January 19, 1974.  It was certified Gold in the U.K. on January 1, 1974.

Track listing

Singles
When I Fall in Love / Are You Lonesome Tonight (No. 14 US Hot 100)
A Time For Us

Charts

Certifications and sales

References

Donny Osmond albums
1973 albums
Albums produced by Mike Curb
Albums produced by Don Costa
MGM Records albums